Aavida Maa Aavide is a 1998 Telugu romantic comedy film written and directed by E. V. V. Satyanarayana, produced by D. Kishore under the Jayabheri Art Productions banner, presented by M. Murali Mohan. It stars Nagarjuna, Tabu and Heera Rajagopal in the lead roles, with music composed by Sri. It was dubbed into Hindi, titled as Biwi No.2 (2000) and Tamil as Police Killadi. The film had an average box office run despite a large opening.

Plot
In Hyderabad, C. I. Vikranth is pressured by his father, to get married. During a police encounter, he meets another police inspector, S. I. Archana and due to circumstances both keep bumping into each other. Eventually they fall in love, get married and have a son. Sometime later, while transferring a criminal to court their jeep gets blasted and everyone in jeep die along with Archana and their son. Vikranth in unable to forget Archana and his son in spite of support from his father and Archana's mother to forget her (as she has died) and move on with his life.

One day they arrange his marriage with a young lady, Jhansi and hide about Vikranth's first marriage. They tell Vikranth that she has accepted marriage on her behalf even after learning about his past and get married. After a while, Archana and their son come back into Vikranth's life. Vikranth learns that she did not die and terrorists had kidnapped her, their son and their men before the jeep blasted. Meanwhile, Jhansi wants to shift to a new flat in the same locality where Archana also resides. Eventually, Archana and Jhansi become neighbours as Vikranth fails to convince Jhansi to not to move to the flat. Both women think that their husbands are look-alikes and that they are not married to one person. Vikranth does a double duty of managing both his wives so that they don't suspect him. Jhansi's cousin Kirloskar is a criminal who was once arrested by Archana and put behind bars. There he befriends another criminal, Murari who goes to jail due to Jhansi because of his multiple marriages and betrayal. These two keep interfering into Jhansi and Vikranth's life and try to expose the truth about Vikranth's first marriage. But they fail everytime. After many failed attempts, at last they expose Vikranth's betrayal to his respective wives. They get angry and think he has cheated on them and send divorce papers. Vikranth says that he loved Archana wholeheartedly while he was devastated by the deaths of his wife and son. His father had advised him to move on because he was living a solo life and he did not want him to live like his father after his mother's death when he was a child. Therefore, to respect his father and mother-in-law's wishes, he remarries Jhansi but he didn't know that Jhansi was unaware about his marriage to Archana. He says that he wanted to tell the truth to Jhansi but her father stopped him because Jhansi did not want to get married as she was a tomboy. He tells him to reveal the truth gradually to ease the matter. Archana and Jhansi say that they know about Vikranth's true nature and they want to divorce him because they cannot accept the each other. Finally, Vikranth admits he can accept only Archana as his wife, whereas Jhansi walks out with her father.

Cast

 Nagarjuna as C. I. Vikranth
 Tabu as S. I. Archana
 Heera Rajagopal as Jhansi
 Kota Srinivasa Rao as Murari
 Srihari as Kirloskar
 Brahmanandam as Head Constable Ramakoti
 Mallikarjuna Rao
 AVS as Hotel Owner
 Giri Babu as Vikranth's father
 Chakravarthy as Jhansi's father
 Rama Prabha as Archana's mother
 Garimalla Viswaswara Rao
 Gadiraju Subba Rao
 Ironleg Sastri
 Shanoor Sana as Head Constable Victoria
 Anuradha

Soundtrack

Music composed by Sri. Lyrics written by Sirivennela Sitarama Sastry. Music released on ADITYA Music Company.

Reception 
The film was reviewed by Zamin Ryot. A critic from Andhra Today wrote that "With hardly any story to carry it, the film rides on the sheer talents of the director and the acting skills of the lead man Nagarjuna. It is their show all along".

References

External links
 

1998 films
Indian romantic comedy films
1998 romantic comedy films
Polygamy in fiction
Comedy of remarriage films
Films directed by E. V. V. Satyanarayana
1990s Telugu-language films